Adya Sharma (Assamese: আদ্য শৰ্মা; 5 November 1929 – 22 February 2015) was a producer of mobile theatre from Nalbari district of Assam.

Sharma was born in Makhibaha, Nalbari district. He was known as Guruji and Kaka (brother). His first production was at the Purbajyoti Theatre in 1966. One of his achievements was staging Titanic in Kohinoor Theatre, one of the leading mobile theatre groups in Assam.

He died in Nalbari, Assam.

References

Assam dramatists and playwrights
1929 births
2015 deaths
People from Nalbari district
20th-century Indian dramatists and playwrights
Dramatists and playwrights from Assam